The Qaisery Gate was the gate into the eight markets with the Faisalabad Clock Tower at the centre. It was built in 1897 under the commission of the British Raj in the then newly-emerging city of  Faisalabad, Punjab.

The entrance itself is made of reinforced concrete and painted pale yellow and light brown to give it a Mughal look. The gate's original markings are still viewable at the top with the name and the date of construction.

The gate is directly in front of the Faisalabad Gumti Water Fountain in the older part of the city. The gate is located on Railway Road, a large market for bathroom accessories, furniture and many banks.

References

External links
Detailed Google map of Faisalabad showing Qaiseri Gate location

See also
 Faisalabad
 Faisalabad International Airport
 Lahore
 Punjab (Pakistan)
 Pakistan

Streets in Faisalabad
Buildings and structures in Faisalabad
Faisalabad